USA-230, also known as SBIRS GEO-1, is a United States military satellite and part of the Space-Based Infrared System.

Overview 

In the mid 1950s, the United States began development of the first space-based missile detection system; the Missile Defense Alarm System (MIDAS), in low Earth orbit. Following the end of the MIDAS programme, plans to deploy an operational system led to the Integrated Missile Early Warning Satellite programme (IMEWS), followed by the Defense Support Program (DSP),

The SBIRS satellites are a replacement for the Defense Support Program early warning system. They are intended to detect ballistic missile launches, as well as various other events in the infrared spectrum, including nuclear explosions, aircraft flights, space object entries and reentries, wildfires and spacecraft launches.

Satellite description 
SBIRS-GEO 1 was manufactured by Lockheed Martin Space and is built upon the A2100M satellite bus.

Launch 
SBIRS GEO-1 was launched on 7 May 2011 from Cape Canaveral (CCAFS), atop an Atlas V 401 (AV-022) launch vehicle.

References 

Spacecraft launched in 2011
Reconnaissance satellites of the United States
USA satellites
Early warning satellites